LDCF may refer to:

 In mathematics, the leading coefficient of a polynomial
 Least Developed Countries Fund of the United Nations
 Liberal Democrat Christian Forum, a British political organization
 Lymphocyte-derived chemotactic factor, a protein
 Lycée Dar Chaaben el Fehri, a school in Tunisia